Peruvian self-coup may refer to:

 1992 Peruvian self-coup, a successful coup performed by President Alberto Fujimori
 2022 Peruvian self-coup attempt, an unsuccessful coup attempted by President Pedro Castillo